The South and Central American Club Beach Handball Championship is the official competition for Men's and Women's Beach handball clubs of the South and Central America Handball Confederation.

Men

Summary

Medal table

Per Club

Per Nation

Women

Summary

Medal table

Per Club

Per Nation

References

External links
 Coscabal official website
 Page of the tournament in Argentina Handball Confederation website

Recurring sporting events established in 2022